The 2015–16 season is South China's 95th season in the top-tier division in Hong Kong football. South China will compete in the Premier League, Senior Challenge Shield and FA Cup in this season.

Key events
 31 May 2015: The club released Kwok Kin Pong, Law Chun Bong, Lee Wai Lim, Evan Kostopoulos, Daniel McBreen, Michael Campion, Detinho and Cheng Lai Hin.
 9 June 2015: Hong Kong striker Chan Man Fai joins the club from Sun Pegasus on a free transfer.
 10 June 2015: Hong Kong defender Cheung Chi Yung joins the club from I-Sky Yuen Long on a free transfer.
 16 June 2015: Hong Kong defender Cheung Kin Fung joins the club from Kitchee on a free transfer.
 24 June 2015: Hong Kong Liang Zicheng joins the club from Eastern for an undisclosed fee.
 30 June 2015: Australian striker Boima Karpeh joins the club from Sporting Goa for an undisclosed fee.
 1 July 2015: Brazilian striker Lucas Espíndola da Silva joins the club from SC Gaúcho for an undisclosed fee.
 2 July 2015: Hong Kong midfielder Lai Yiu Cheong joins the club from Wong Tai Sin on a free transfer.
 19 July 2015: Hong Kong defender Moses Mensah joins the club from Yokohama FC Hong Kong on a free transfer.
 22 July 2015: Brazilian midfielder Luiz Carlos Vieira joins the club from Club Deportivo San José for an undisclosed fee.
 25 July 2015: Defender Andy Russell, goalkeeper Tsang Man Fai and striker Yuto Nakamura join fellow Hong Kong Premier League club Wong Tai Sin on loan until the end of the season.

Players

Squad information

Last update: 26 July 2015
Source: South China Football Team
Ordered by squad number.
LPLocal player; FPForeign player; NRNon-registered player

Transfers

In

Summer

Out

Summer

Loan In

Summer

Loan Out

Summer

Club

Coaching staff

Squad statistics

Overall Stats
{|class="wikitable" style="text-align: center;"
|-
!width="100"|
!width="60"|League
!width="60"|Senior Shield
!width="60"|FA Cup
!width="60"|League Cup
!width="60"|2015 AFC Cup
!width="60"|Total Stats
|-
|align=left|Games played    ||  0  ||  0  ||  0  ||  0  ||  0  || 0
|-
|align=left|Games won       ||  0  ||  0  ||  0  ||  0  ||  0  || 0
|-
|align=left|Games drawn     ||  0  ||  0  ||  0  ||  0  ||  0  || 0
|-
|align=left|Games lost      ||  0  ||  0  ||  0  ||  0  ||  0  || 0
|-
|align=left|Goals for       ||  0  ||  0  ||  0  ||  0  ||  0  || 0
|-
|align=left|Goals against   ||  0  ||  0  ||  0  ||  0  ||  0  || 0
|- =
|align=left|Players used    ||  0  ||  0  ||  0  ||  0  ||  0  || 0
|-
|align=left|Yellow cards    ||  0  ||  0  ||  0  ||  0  ||  0  || 0
|-
|align=left|Red cards       ||  0  ||  0  ||  0  ||  0  ||  0  || 0
|-

Appearances and goals
Key

No. = Squad number

Pos. = Playing position

Nat. = Nationality

Apps = Appearances

GK = Goalkeeper

DF = Defender

MF = Midfielder

FW = Forward

Numbers in parentheses denote appearances as substitute. Players with number struck through and marked  left the club during the playing season.

Top scorers

The list is sorted by shirt number when total goals are equal.

Disciplinary record
Includes all competitive matches.Players listed below made at least one appearance for Southern first squad during the season.

Substitution Record
Includes all competitive matches.

Last updated: 25 July 2015

Captains

Competitions

Overall

Premier League

Classification

Results summary

Matches

Pre-season friendlies

2015 AFC Cup

References

South China AA seasons
Hong Kong football clubs 2015–16 season